Institute of Bankers of Sri Lanka, also abbreviated as IBSL, is a professional apex body of the banking education in Sri Lanka. It is one of the prominent institutes which carryout banking courses for the students and it is closely associated with Central Bank of Sri Lanka. The institute was formally established as Bankers' Training Institute in 1964 by the Central Bank of Sri Lanka. Bankers' Training Institute was reincorporated in 1979 as Institute of Bankers of Sri Lanka under the provisions of Parliament Act no 26 of 1979.

The institute is managed by governing board of 12 high ranking banking sector professionals including 2 members from CBSL. The purpose of the institute is to provide education in Banking and Finance for banking and non-banking personnel. The chairman of IBSL is the Deputy Governor of the CBSL. IBSL provides membership of the institute in five categories including Honorary Fellows, Fellows (life), Associate (life) Members, Associate Members and Student Members (Active).

Notable alumni 

 Visna Fernando - beauty pageant contestant
 P. Amarasinghe - former CBSL governor
 Kamal Abeysinghe - banker and social activist
 Ranee Jayamaha - banker, economist and author

References 

Banking institutes
Banking in Sri Lanka
Professional associations based in Sri Lanka
1965 establishments in Ceylon